Andrew Doyle (born 2 July 1960) is an Irish former Fine Gael politician who was a Teachta Dála (TD) for the Wicklow constituency from 2007 to 2020. He served as Minister of State at the Department of Agriculture, Food and the Marine from 2016 to 2020.

Early life and education
Doyle graduated from Rockwell Agricultural College, in County Tipperary, in 1978, and as a young farmer in 1981, he won the Stephen Cullinane Scholarship to New Zealand, where he played rugby in Canterbury.

Personal life
Doyle runs the family farm in County Wicklow, which has been in his family for six generations. He is married to Ann Smith and they have three sons and one daughter.

Politics
He has been a member of Fine Gael since 1983, and first sought election to Wicklow County Council in the East Wicklow local electoral area, where he served from 1999 to 2007, and was Chairman of the council from 2005 to 2006. He was elected to the Dáil, on his first attempt at the 2007 general election. During his first term in the Dáil, he was party Spokesperson on Agriculture, Fisheries and Food from July 2010 to March 2011, having previously served as deputy Spokesperson on Agriculture, with special responsibility for Food and Horticulture from 2007 to 2010. He was re-elected to the 31st Dáil at the 2011 general election, topping the poll in the constituency, and was elected for the third time at the 2016 general election.

Doyle introduced two private member's bills in the Dáil. He introduced the Food (Fair Trade and Information) Bill 2009 to provide in the interests of the common good for the prohibition of activities which prevent, restrict or distort fair trade in grocery goods in the State. He also introduced the Electoral (Amendment) (Hours of Polling) Bill 2013, to set voting hours for Dáil elections, Dáil by-elections, Presidential elections, European Parliament elections, Local Government elections and Referendums. Neither bill was enacted.

As Chairman of the Oireachtas Joint Committee on Agriculture, Food, and the Marine, he also produced the first parliamentary report on the Offshore Oil and Gas sector in 2012, which called for a new fiscal licensing regime in Offshore Oil and Gas exploration off the coast of Ireland. As part of the Irish Presidency of the Council of the European Union in 2013, he hosted a conference in Dublin Castle with EU member states Parliamentary Agriculture Committee Chairs from all 27 countries, engaging parliamentarians with speakers such as the European Commissioner for Agriculture, and then Romanian Prime Minister, Dacian Ciolos and the European Commissioner for Fisheries, Maria Damanaki.

In the 2016 general election, Doyle won the fourth seat in Wicklow. On 19 May 2016, he was appointed by the minority Fine Gael–Independent government on the nomination of Taoiseach Enda Kenny as Minister of State at the Department of Agriculture, Food and the Marine with special responsibility for Food, Forestry and Horticulture. He was appointed to the same position on 20 June 2017 when Leo Varadkar formed a new government after succeeding Kenny as Fine Gael leader.

He lost his seat at the general election on 8 February 2020, and continued to serve as a minister of state until the formation of a new government on 27 June 2020.

References

1960 births
Living people
Fine Gael TDs
Irish farmers
Local councillors in County Wicklow
Members of the 30th Dáil
Members of the 31st Dáil
Members of the 32nd Dáil
Ministers of State of the 32nd Dáil